Kim Dong-wook (born 23 April 1993) is a South Korean short track speed skater.

He participated at the 2019–20 ISU Short Track Speed Skating World Cup, winning a medal.

Filmography

Television show

References

External links

1993 births
Living people
South Korean male short track speed skaters
Olympic short track speed skaters of South Korea
Short track speed skaters at the 2022 Winter Olympics
Olympic silver medalists for South Korea
Olympic medalists in short track speed skating
Medalists at the 2022 Winter Olympics
21st-century South Korean people